Harriet M. Cornwell Tourist House is a historic tourist home for African-American patrons located at Columbia, South Carolina. It was built about 1895, and is a two-story, frame American Foursquare style dwelling. It has a hipped roof and features a one-story wraparound porch.  Mrs. Cornwell began operating her house as a tourist home during the 1940s.

It was added to the National Register of Historic Places in 2007.

References

African-American history of South Carolina
Houses on the National Register of Historic Places in South Carolina
Houses completed in 1895
Houses in Columbia, South Carolina
National Register of Historic Places in Columbia, South Carolina